MicroRNA 425 is a microRNA that in humans is encoded by the MIR425 gene.

References

Further reading 

MicroRNA